Ormond Walker Wetmore (May 12, 1868 – November 21, 1930) was a Canadian politician. He served in the Legislative Assembly of New Brunswick from 1921 to 1925 as member of the Liberal party. He was a lieutenant colonel with the 74th Brunswick Rangers, retiring in 1916. He died in 1930, aged 62.

References 

1868 births
1930 deaths
New Brunswick Liberal Association MLAs